Light Up! is a 2017 Russian musical drama film directed and written by Kirill Pletnyov. The film took part in the main competitive program of the film festival Kinotavr 2017.

Plot 
The female colony supervisor has the opportunity to participate in the main Russian music show. And the singer who is a prisoner of the colony will help her with this.

Cast
 Viktoriya Isakova as Masha Star
 Inga Strelkova-Oboldina as Alevtina
 Vladimir Ilyin as Ivanych
 Tatyana Dogileva	as Yelena Sysoeva
 Anna Ukolova as Vera
 Aleksey Shevchenkov as Sergey
 Daniil Steklov as Mazhor  
 Aleksandra Bortich as Zhenya, Sysoeva's daughter 
 Yekaterina Ageeva as Shurka
 Olga Buzova as cameo

Production
The script is based on the true story of British singer Sam Bailey, the winner of the 10th season of musical TV show   The X Factor (2013), who worked as a warden in a men's prison.

The main role in the script written by  Pletnyov specifically for the actress Inga Oboldina, who starred in his short film  Nastya. The second main female role was written for Ksenia Rappoport, but played it in the end Viktoria Isakova. Both Actresses sing with their voices, with the exception of Opera arias.

References

External links 
 

2017 films
2010s Russian-language films
Russian musical drama films
2010s musical drama films
2010s prison films
2017 directorial debut films
2017 drama films